Pär Lindholm (born 5 October 1991) is a Swedish professional ice hockey centre currently playing for Skellefteå AIK of the Swedish Hockey League (SHL).

Playing career 
Lindholm made his professional debut with Skellefteå AIK in the Elitserien during the 2009–10 Elitserien season.

In the 2017–18 season, Lindholm established himself as a dominant center in the Swedish Hockey League, scoring 47 points in 49 regular-season games as well as 11 points in 16 playoff games for finalists Skellefteå AIK.

On 17 May 2018, having gained NHL attention, Lindholm signed as an undrafted free agent to a one-year, entry-level contract with the Toronto Maple Leafs.

After attending the Maple Leafs 2018 training camp, Lindholm made the opening night roster to begin the 2018–19 season. He made his NHL debut against traditional rivals the Montreal Canadiens in the Maple Leafs 3–2 overtime victory on 3 October 2018. Playing as the Maple Leafs fourth-line center, Lindholm recorded his first career NHL goal on 13 October 2018 in a 4–2 win over the Washington Capitals. He appeared in every game for the Maple Leafs leading up to the trade deadline, contributing 12 points in 61 games before he was dealt to the Winnipeg Jets in exchange for Nic Petan on 25 February 2019.

On 1 July 2019, Lindholm joined his third NHL club, signing as a free agent to a two-year, $850,000 contract with the Boston Bruins. In the pandemic delayed 2020–21 season, having featured in just 1 regular season game with the Bruins, while predominantly serving as a healthy scratch, on February 14, 2021, Lindholm was placed on unconditional waivers for the purposes of contract termination by the Bruins after agreeing to a multi-year contract to return to his original Swedish club, Skellefteå AIK.

Upon completion of the 2020–21 season with Skellefteå AIK, having collected 6 points through 12 playoff games, Lindholm left the SHL in agreeing to a one-year contract with Russian club, Ak Bars Kazan of the Kontinental Hockey League (KHL), on 19 May 2021. In the following 2021–22 season, Lindholm registered 7 goals and 12 assists for 19 points in just 29 regular season games.

At the conclusion of his contract with Ak Bars, Lindholm opted to leave Russia and return again to Skellefteå AIK of the SHL, agreeing to a three-year contract on 3 May 2022.

Career statistics

Regular season and playoffs

International

References

External links

1991 births
Living people
Ak Bars Kazan players
Boston Bruins players
Karlskrona HK players
Ice hockey players at the 2018 Winter Olympics
Olympic ice hockey players of Sweden
Piteå HC players
Skellefteå AIK players
IF Sundsvall Hockey players
Swedish ice hockey centres
People from Skellefteå Municipality
Toronto Maple Leafs players
Undrafted National Hockey League players
Winnipeg Jets players
Sportspeople from Västerbotten County